Tricypha imperialis is a moth in the family Erebidae. It was described by Franciscus J. M. Heylaerts in 1884. It is found in Mexico, Panama, Peru, Ecuador and Brazil.

References

Moths described in 1884
Phaegopterina
Arctiinae of South America
Moths of North America